The Journal of Theological Interpretation is a biannual peer-reviewed academic journal covering theology and biblical hermeneutics. It was established in 2007 and is published by Eisenbrauns. The editor-in-chief is Joel B. Green (Fuller Theological Seminary). The journal is abstracted and indexed in ATLA Religion Database.

References

External links 
 

Christianity studies journals
Publications established in 2007
English-language journals
Biannual journals
Eisenbrauns academic journals
Biblical exegesis
Hermeneutics